Warm Nights (transliterated/lit. Al-Layaly al-Dafe’a) is an Egyptian film released in 1961. It stars Sabah, Emad Hamdy, and Poussi.

Cast
 Sabah (Laila)
 Emad Hamdy (Dr. Ahmed Badreddin)
 Poussi
 Zahrat El-Ola (Souad)
 Kamal el-Shennawi (Dr. Amar)
 Negma Ibrahim (Ahmed's mother)
 Thurayya Fakhry
 Ragaa Hussein
 Qadreya Kamel
 Ali Roushdy

External links
 El Cinema page
 Dhliz page

References

Egyptian drama films
1961 films